Richard Paris may refer to:
 Richard Paris (cyclist)
 Richard Paris (production designer)
 Richard Bruce Paris (1946–2022), British mathematician